Jalayagnam or Jala Yagnam, (water worship), is a water management program in India. It has been implemented by Chief Minister of Andhra Pradesh, India, Dr. Y. S. Rajasekhara Reddy as an election promise to the farmers of the state to bring 8.2 million acres (8.2 million acres) under irrigation in five years. Y.S.R has taken required approvals from central government and NGTL. Also other required permissions for all the projects before he died. Like Site clearance, environmental clearance, R & R clearance, wildlife sanctuary clearance, forest clearance and technical advisory committee clearance. By the time he supposed to execute projects on phase manner, Y.S.R died in accident. Subsequently there was other issues like state bifurcation came to high intensity, subsequent Chief Ministers failed to give priority for Jalayagnam.

The project
This project accords the highest priority for the development of irrigation infrastructure, particularly in backward and drought prone areas by taking up this program in a big way. Jala Yagnam includes a number of irrigation projects by construction of reservoirs and lift irrigation systems for lifting water from major rivers, particularly from Godavari, to provide immediate irrigation benefits.  
The Jala Yagnam program was to complete 32 major and 17 medium irrigation projects at a cost of Rs. 650 billion to provide irrigation to an extent of 7.1 million acres besides stabilization of an existing ayacut of 2,132,000 acres while providing drinking water to a population of 12 million and generating power to the tune of 1700 MW. Eight of these projects were to be completed before the kharif season of 2006.

The project requires the construction of 78 dams and is expected to displace significant numbers of people whose villages will be submerged. The irrigation development was almost stagnant for the last decade and the previous governments concentrated on hi-tech and neglected the agricultural sector, on which approximately 70% of the population depends. The fact that 26% of the population, mostly in rural areas, was living below the poverty line made Dr. Reddy wonder whether science and technology had made a significant difference in the quality of life in rural areas, compared to towns and cities. Also the suicides of many farmers from the state made Dr. Y. S. Rajasekhara Reddy give more significance to the irrigation sector. Having recognized the importance of the agricultural sector for faster economic development, Dr. Y. S. Rajasekhara Reddy started concentrating largely on its development and introduced several schemes for the benefit of the farmers, one of which is the Jala Yagnam project.
 
In the past 50 years, a total ayacut of 6.5 million acres was developed in the state. Jala Yagnam is expected to double the area under irrigation. It would constitute a major component of the Central government programme National Irrigation Mission's (NIM) target of bringing ten million hectares of land (25 million acres) in the country under the plough. The largest allocation of funds, during 2004-09, is for irrigation, as the government considers irrigation an important growth engine.

The most expensive of the projects are the lift irrigation projects intended to irrigate the dry Telangana region and supply water to the Anantapur - Ongole - Mahabubnagar area which is "turning into a desert". With the land level being 300 metres above the water level, lift irrigation is supposed to be the only way to take water to the dry region. Currently, 3,000 tmc water from Godavari is washed into the sea, as the land is at a higher elevation.

For the first time in the post-independence era, the Congress government took up linking of Godavari and Krishna by constructing the Indira Sagar Project and Rajiv Sagar project across the River Godavari. By executing projects like Rajiv Sagar, Indira Sagar flood flow canal, SRSP Phase-II and so on, 2.1 million acres of parched land in Telangana region would be made fertile.

Maps
This is the link which redirects to the map in which all the Jalayagnam projects are seen and also projects which have been 
already finished by Andhra Pradesh government. Details such as estimated and actual costs of Jalayagnam projects are also included. For completed projects, details like district they are in and rivers they are on are also included.

Jalayagnam and other completed projects'map

Controversies
The documents obtained from Right to Information Act of India indicates that show the irregularities that were committed range from violation of the common tender document to illegally made excessive payments for the works done and fraudulently claimed to have been done.

List of projects
 55 major irrigation projects
 Alisagar Lift Irrigation Scheme
 Chagalnadu Lift Irrigation Scheme
 Dummugudem Hydro Electric Project
 Galeru-Nagari Sujala Sravanthi Project
 Gundlakamma Project
 Guru Raghavendra Lift Irrigation Scheme
 H N S D W S PROJECT
 Handri Niva Sujala Sravanthi Drinking Water Supply Scheme
 Inchampally Project
 J. Chokka Rao (Godavari) Lift Irrigation Scheme
 Jawaharlal Nehru (Nettempadu) Lift Irrigation Scheme
 K.C. Canal Modernisation
 Lendi Project
 Lower Penganga Project - R.B. Canal
 Mahathma Gandhi (Kalwakurthy) Lift Irrigation Scheme
 Nagarjunasagar Project
 Polavaram (Indira Sagar) Project
 Pranahitha PROJECT
 Priyadarshini Jurala Project
 Pulichintala Project
 Pushkaram Lift Irrigation Scheme
 Rajiv (Bhima) Lift Irrigation Scheme
 Rajiv Sagar (Dhummu Gudem) Lift Irrigation Project
 S.L.B.C (A M R) Project
 S.R.S.P (Flood Flow Canal)
 Sangam Banda ( PART OF BHEEMA L I ) PROJECT
 Singoor Project
 Somasila Project
 Somasila - Swarnamukhi Link Canal
 Sri Padha Sagar (Yellampally Project)
 Sriramasagar Project Stage- I
 Sriramasagar Project Stage- II
 Srisailam Right Branch Canal Scheme
 TadipudiI Lift Irrigation Scheme
 Tarakarama L I Scheme
 TBP. HLC. Stage-II Project
 Telugu Ganga Project
 Thotapally Barrage Scheme
 Vamsadhara Project Phase-II of Stage-II
 Vamsadhara Project Stage I
 Vamshadhara Phase I of Stage II (RMC)
 Velogonda Project
 Yeleru Reservoir Project
 36 medium irrigation projects
 Bhupathipalem Reservoir Scheme
 Gollavagu Reservoir Project
 Gundlavagu Project
 Jalimudi Diversion Scheme
 Janjhavathi Reservoir Project
 Jerrikona Project
 Kanupur Canal
 Koilsagar Lift Irrigation Scheme
 Komaram Bheem Project
 Mathadivagu Reservoir Project
 Modikuntavagu Project
 Murreduvagu Project
 Musurumilli Reservoir Scheme
 Palemvagu Project
 Paleru Reservoir Scheme
 Pampa Reservoir Project
 Peddagavagu (NEELWAI)
 Peddagedda Reservoir
 Peddavagu Diversion Scheme (JAGANNATHAPUR)
 Peddavagu Project (DASNAPUR)
 Peddavagu Project (BARKAGUDEM)
 Railvagu Reservoir Project
 Tarakarama Thirtha Sagaram 
 Veligallu Reservoir Project

References

Irrigation in Andhra Pradesh
Irrigation projects
Economy of Andhra Pradesh